Femøren station is a rapid transit station on the Copenhagen Metro located in the Sundbyøster district of Copenhagen. It opened on 28 September 2007.

The station serves the M2 line. It is located in fare zone 3.

External links
 Femøren station on www.m.dk 
 Femøren station on www.m.dk 

M2 (Copenhagen Metro) stations
Railway stations opened in 2007
Railway stations in Denmark opened in the 21st century